Viktor Antonov (born 1951) is a Russian politician and member of the State Duma of the Russian Federation.

References 

Living people
1951 births
Fifth convocation members of the State Duma (Russian Federation)
Place of birth missing (living people)
Date of birth missing (living people)